Dynablaster or Dyna Blaster is a name that has been given to the European releases of three different games of the Bomberman franchise:

 Bomberman (TurboGrafx-16, MS-DOS, Amiga and Atari ST)
 Bomberman II (NES)
 Atomic Punk (Game Boy)

Bomberman was renamed Dyna Blaster due to the European mainstream media associating the original name with terrorist bombings.